James Austin Walsh (23 January 1926 – 21 August 1996) was a rugby union player who represented Australia.

Walsh, a hooker, was born in Orange, New South Wales and claimed a total of 4 international rugby caps for Australia.

References

Australian rugby union players
Australia international rugby union players
1926 births
1996 deaths
Rugby union players from New South Wales
Rugby union hookers